Jacqueline Coats is a theatre director based in New Zealand who has worked in both opera and children's theatre, she has worked for various organisations including the New Zealand Festival, New Zealand Opera and Victorian Opera (Melbourne).

Biography 
Coats is educated from the University of Idaho, and in 2002 graduated with a Master of Theatre Arts in Directing from Victoria University of Wellington and Toi Whakaari: NZ Drama School. She also has a  postgraduate diploma in Arts Education Management from the University of Leeds. She was a singer in the New Zealand Youth Choir, and has been an actor and a singer.

She has been directing NZ Opera's touring Opera in Schools programme since 2015. 

Children's theatre companies she has worked for include Little Dog Barking, the theatre company of the Peter Wilson (who died in 2021), and Capital E National Theatre for Children. A very popular touring production for children by Capital E that Coats directed is Seasons in 2021 first created by Peter Wilson, Laughton Pattrick (who died in 2020) and Jenny Pattrick in 2000 and Coats was one of the performers. This production honoured the memory of  Peter Wilson and Laughton Pattrick.

Coats received the Peter Lees-Jeffries Memorial Scholarship from the Dame Malvina Major Foundation in 2018 for professional development and the Pettman DARE Fellowship at Opera North, University of Leeds in 2019.

In 2020 Coats directed a concert at the Whanganui Royal Opera House in her role as Stagecraft Director with the New Zealand Opera School.

In 2021 Coats directed the Auckland Philharmonia Orchestra's annual Opera in Concert at the Auckland Town Hall.

Awards 
1997 - Most Original Production, Chapman Tripp Theatre Awards for Bent by Martin Sherman

2014 - Director of the Year, Dunedin Theatre Awards for This Other Eden.

Credits

References 

Living people
Year of birth missing (living people)
New Zealand theatre people
New Zealand theatre directors
Toi Whakaari alumni
Victoria University of Wellington alumni